Hex; Or Printing in the Infernal Method is the fourth full-length studio album by American drone doom band Earth.

Background
Marking a new direction the band would follow in years to come, Hex stands in stark contrast to Earth's previous works. While retaining the extremely heavy doom/drone metal song structure of epic riffs over simple repetitive drum beats, the guitar was inflected with country influences that favored a cleaner reverb-heavy tone layered with acoustic instruments over the band's previous predilection for distortion. The press release cited diverse influences such as Ennio Morricone, Billy Gibbons, Neil Young's soundtrack to the movie Dead Man, country musicians Duane Eddy, Merle Haggard, and Roy Buchanan. Carlson indicated that he viewed this shift as part of a continuum rather than a categorical change in direction:

The album was influenced by Cormac McCarthy, particularly his novel Blood Meridian. Every song title on the album is named after a phrase found in the text of the novel. Carlson commented that:

Carlson said that "There's an arc to each song and an arc to the album, rather than just a collection of songs. There's silence and a sense of space to the music". The subtitle is from William Blake's The Marriage of Heaven and Hell. It was well received by fans of the band and critics alike despite the change in sound.

When asked about the elimination of distortion, Carlson remarked:

Reception

Critics acknowledged the sharp transformation in the band's sound and were generally favorable towards Hex.  Writing for Pitchfork, Austin Gaines described the album as a "surprisingly beautiful instrumental album" that exchanged distorted riffing for "the austere beauty of a telecaster roaming the Western U.S."  In Exclaim!, Kevin Hainey praised the album as "an elegant and singular effort filled with sparsely beautiful passages that lead headlong into the void". Within the band's stylistic transformation, Todd DePalma observed in Chronicles of Chaos "a stripped, damn near ossified sound that yields a more conceptual - and by far the heaviest - album of [Earth's] storied lifespan".

Track listing

Personnel
Dylan Carlson – guitar, banjo, baritone guitar
Adrienne Davies – drums, percussion, wind chime
John Schuller – bass guitar
Dan Tyack – lap and pedal steel guitar
Steve Moore – trombone, tubular bells
Randall Dunn – production, harmonica, recording

References

2005 albums
Earth (American band) albums
Southern Lord Records albums
Albums produced by Randall Dunn